The list of ship launches in 1660 includes a chronological list of some ships launched in 1660.

References 

Lists of ship launches
1660 in transport
1660s ships